Noel Thornton (3 June 1943 − 11 January 2018) was an Australian rugby league footballer who played in the 1960s and later became  a coach in the 1970s.

Playing career
Thornton's career started at Western Suburbs, and he played two seasons with them between 1965-1966. Thornton played hooker during his career. He also played for Cronulla-Sutherland for two seasons between 1968-1969, and went on to coach the club for the 1974 NSWRFL season.

References

1943 births
2018 deaths
Australian rugby league players
Cronulla-Sutherland Sharks coaches
Cronulla-Sutherland Sharks players
Rugby league hookers
Rugby league players from Sydney
Western Suburbs Magpies players